Urszula Figwer (born 25 April 1931) is a Polish javelin thrower. She was born in Inwałd. She competed at the 1956 Summer Olympics in Melbourne, where she placed sixth in women's javelin throw. She also competed at the 1960 Summer Olympics in Rome, where she placed fifth in women's javelin throw.

References

External links

1931 births
Living people
People from Wadowice County
Polish female javelin throwers
Olympic athletes of Poland
Athletes (track and field) at the 1956 Summer Olympics
Athletes (track and field) at the 1960 Summer Olympics
Sportspeople from Lesser Poland Voivodeship
Universiade medalists in athletics (track and field)
Universiade silver medalists for Poland
Medalists at the 1959 Summer Universiade
20th-century Polish women